On Guerrilla Warfare is Mao Zedong's case for the extensive use of an irregular form of warfare in which small groups of combatants use mobile military tactics in the forms of ambushes and raids to combat a larger and less mobile formal army. Mao wrote the book in 1937 to convince Chinese political and military leaders that guerilla style-tactics were necessary for the Chinese to use in the Second Sino-Japanese War.

Overview

Chapter 1: What is Guerrilla Warfare?
Mao states that guerrilla warfare is "a powerful special weapon with which we resist the Japanese and without which we cannot defeat them." Mao explains how guerrilla warfare can only succeed if employed by revolutionaries because it is a political and military style. According to Mao, guerrilla warfare is a way for the Chinese to expel an intruder that has more arms, equipment, and troops.

Chapter 2: The Relation of Guerrilla Hostilities to Regular Operations 
"A primary feature of guerrilla operations is their dependence upon the people themselves to organize battalions and other units." In chapter 2, Mao explains the differences and the relationship between guerrilla and regular troops. Guerilla warfare needs to be decentralized to allow quickness and detachment. However, orthodox troops can temporarily adopt guerrilla strategy and vice versa.

Chapter 3: Guerrilla Warfare in History 
Mao refers to a bevy of wars from different continents to support his belief that guerrilla warfare is necessary to expel more powerful potential conquerors. He refers specifically to Russian resistance during the French invasion of Russia and the Abyssinians' failures to resist Italian aggression in the Second Italo-Abyssinian War. He also makes reference to the use of guerrilla tactics in the Sanyuanli incident during the First Opium War, the Taiping Rebellion, and the Boxer Uprising. He also states that guerrilla warfare cannot succeed on its own without orthodox warfare. The two should work together in an effort to defeat a larger, stronger enemy.

Chapter 4: Can Victory be Attained by Guerrilla Operations? 
Mao explains that Japan's military efforts do not have complete citizen and soldier support. He believes that China can defeat the enemy if they use guerrilla warfare and extend the duration of the war.

Chapter 5: Organization for Guerrilla Warfare 
Mao says that guerrilla bands can be created from the masses or soldiers. Guerrilla units should learn to be independent of higher leadership because they may need to function without it. "The most important natural quality is that of complete loyalty to the idea of the people’s emancipation. If this is present, the others will develop; if it is not present, nothing can be done." Guerrilla troops should acquire supplies, ammunition, and weapons from the Japanese after victories on the battle field.

Chapter 6: The Political Problems of Guerrilla Warfare 
Mao explains the inalienable political aspects of guerrilla warfare and any warfare in general. "Military action is a method used to attain a political goal. While military action and political affairs are not identical, it is impossible to isolate one from the other." Chinese guerrilla soldiers must be self-disciplined and committed to the revolutionary cause or the effort will fail. Soldiers must sacrifice some democratic privileges in the effort to defeat the Japanese.

Chapter 7: The Strategy of Guerrilla Resistance against Japan 
Mao explains that guerrilla troops should have no conception of defense or battle lines. They should attack orthodox Japanese troops from the front, the sides, and the rear. Guerrilla troops should always dictate the timing of conflicts with the enemy. They should be prepared to flee if need be.

References
Mao, Tse-tung. On Guerrilla Warfare. Champaign, Ill: First Illinois Paperback, 2000. Print.

External links
Mao Tse-tung on guerrilla warfare on Internet Archive

On Guerrilla Warfare on Marxists Internet Archive

Mao Tse-tung on Guerrilla Warfare on Google Books

1937 non-fiction books
Chinese military texts
Ideology of the Chinese Communist Party
Non-fiction books about guerrilla warfare
Works by Mao Zedong